The following television stations broadcast on digital channel 14 in the United States:

 K14AG-D in Circle, etc., Montana
 K14AL-D in Ely, Nevada
 K14AR-D in Glasgow, Montana
 K14AT-D in Ridgecrest, California, on virtual channel 52, which rebroadcasts KVEA
 K14BF-D in Wenatchee, Washington
 K14GW-D in Corvallis, Oregon
 K14HC-D in Prescott, Arizona, on virtual channel 45, which rebroadcasts KUTP
 K14HG-D in Kingman, Arizona
 K14HT-D in Walla Walla, etc., Washington
 K14HX-D in Lakehead, California
 K14IC-D in Burley, Idaho
 K14IJ-D in Leadore, Idaho
 K14IO-D in Pierre, South Dakota
 K14IU-D in Frenchtown, etc., Montana
 K14JS-D in Cortez, etc., Colorado
 K14JY-D in Walker Lake, Nevada
 K14JZ-D in Peetz, Colorado, on virtual channel 51, which rebroadcasts K16NJ-D
 K14KD-D in Frost, Minnesota
 K14KE-D in St. James, Minnesota
 K14KK-D in Flagstaff, Arizona, on virtual channel 8, which rebroadcasts KAET
 K14KL-D in Pleasant Valley, Colorado, on virtual channel 31, which rebroadcasts KDVR
 K14LB-D in Idalia, Colorado, on virtual channel 31, which rebroadcasts KDVR
 K14LF-D in Willmar, Minnesota, on virtual channel 23, which rebroadcasts WUCW
 K14LP-D in Cottage Grove, Oregon
 K14LT-D in Polson, Montana
 K14LW-D in Myton, Utah
 K14LZ-D in Alexandria, Minnesota, on virtual channel 23, which rebroadcasts WUCW
 K14MC-D in Lava Hot Springs, Idaho
 K14MI-D in Niobrara, Nebraska
 K14MQ-D in Coos Bay, Oregon
 K14MU-D in Weatherford, Oklahoma
 K14NA-D in Globe & Miami, Arizona
 K14ND-D in Overton, Nevada
 K14NF-D in Jacks Cabin, Colorado, on virtual channel 4, which rebroadcasts K04DH-D
 K14NI-D in Ferndale, Montana
 K14NJ-D in Hot Springs, Montana
 K14NM-D in Anton & Southwest Washington County, Colorado, on virtual channel 9, which rebroadcasts KUSA
 K14NR-D in Tyler, Texas
 K14NU-D in Beowawe, Nevada
 K14NY-D in Sayre, Oklahoma
 K14OA-D in Preston, Idaho, on virtual channel 9, which rebroadcasts KUEN
 K14OB-D in Eureka, Nevada
 K14OV-D in Snowmass Village, Colorado
 K14PA-D in Rural Juab County, Utah
 K14PF-D in Peoa/Oakley, Utah
 K14PH-D in Baudette, Minnesota
 K14PX-D in Paxico, Kansas
 K14QC-D in Mexican Hat, Utah
 K14QG-D in Alamogordo, New Mexico
 K14QH-D in Butte Falls, Oregon
 K14QP-D in Woodward, etc., Oklahoma
 K14QS-D in Wanship, Utah
 K14QT-D in Texarkana, Texas
 K14QV-D in Childress, Texas
 K14QX-D in Hatch, Utah
 K14QY-D in Rural Sevier County, Utah
 K14QZ-D in Mount Pleasant, Utah, on virtual channel 11, which rebroadcasts KBYU-TV
 K14RA-D in Teasdale/Torrey, Utah
 K14RB-D in St. Paul, Minnesota, on virtual channel 14
 K14RC-D in Richfield, etc., Utah, on virtual channel 2, which rebroadcasts KUTV
 K14RD-D in Koosharem, Utah
 K14RE-D in Panguitch, Utah
 K14RF-D in Cody, Wyoming
 K14RG-D in Circleville, Utah
 K14RH-D in Henrieville, Utah
 K14RJ-D in Mayfield, Utah
 K14RK-D in Phoenix, Arizona
 K14RL-D in Samak, Utah, on virtual channel 2, which rebroadcasts KUTV
 K14RM-D in Laketown, etc., Utah, on virtual channel 2, which rebroadcasts KUTV
 K14RN-D in Scipio, Utah
 K14RO-D in St. George, etc., Utah, on virtual channel 11, which rebroadcasts KBYU-TV
 K14RP-D in Leamington, Utah
 K14RT-D in Fruitland, Utah
 K14RU-D in Spring Glen, Utah
 K14RV-D in Forsyth, Montana
 K14RW-D in Grants Pass, Oregon
 K14RX-D in Ashland, Montana
 K14RY-D in Malad & surrounding, Idaho
 K14SA-D in Wray, Colorado, on virtual channel 2, which rebroadcasts K16NJ-D
 K14SB-D in Terrace Lakes, Idaho
 K14SC-D in Ashland, Oregon
 K14SD-D in South Lake Tahoe, California
 K14SE-D in McDermitt, Nevada
 K14SF-D in Brewster, etc., Washington
 K14SH-D in Marshfield, Missouri
 K14TF-D in Opelousas, Louisiana
 K14TG-D in Monterey, California
 K14TH-D in Williams, Oregon
 K14TK-D in Santa Maria, California
 K19IF-D in Nephi, Utah, on virtual channel 2, which rebroadcasts KUTV
 KAOE-LD in Santa Fe, New Mexico
 KAOM-LD in Sweetwater, Texas
 KAPP in Yakima, Washington
 KAUO-LD in Amarillo, Texas
 KBND-LP in Bend, Oregon
 KCSG in Cedar City, Utah, on virtual channel 8
 KDTS-LD in San Francisco, California, on virtual channel 52
 KERA-TV in Dallas, Texas, on virtual channel 13
 KFXB-TV in Dubuque, Iowa
 KGCE-LD in Garden City, Kansas
 KGWC-TV in Casper, Wyoming
 KIBN-LD in Lufkin, Texas
 KINV-LD in Billings, Montana
 KJCS-LD in Colorado Springs, Colorado
 KLAF-LD in Lafayette, Louisiana
 KMCY in Minot, North Dakota
 KMMC-LD in San Francisco, California, uses KDTS-LD's spectrum, on virtual channel 30
 KMMW-LD in Stockton, California, on virtual channel 33, which rebroadcasts KCSO-LD
 KNBX-CD in Las Vegas, Nevada
 KNLC in St. Louis, Missouri, on virtual channel 24
 KNRC-LD in Sparks, Nevada
 KOCW in Hoisington, Kansas
 KOCY-LD in Oklahoma City, Oklahoma
 KPBN-LD in Baton Rouge, Louisiana
 KPHS-LD in Lovelock, Nevada
 KQPS-LD in Hot Springs, Arkansas
 KQTA-LD in San Francisco, California, uses KDTS-LD's spectrum, on virtual channel 15
 KQUP-LD in Spokane, Washington
 KSAO-LD in Sacramento, California, on virtual channel 49
 KSNV in Las Vegas, Nevada
 KSVT-LD in Twin Falls, Idaho
 KTGM in Tamuning, Guam
 KTLM in Rio Grande City, Texas
 KTIV in Sioux City, Iowa
 KUDF-LP in Tucson, Arizona
 KUKC-LD in Kansas City, Missouri, on virtual channel 20
 KULX-CD in Ogden, Utah, on virtual channel 10, which rebroadcasts KTMW
 KVIQ-LD in Eureka, California
 KVOS-TV in Bellingham, Washington, on virtual channel 12
 KVQT-LD in Houston, Texas, on virtual channel 21
 KWTC-LD in Kerrville, Texas
 KXBF-LD in Bakersfield, California
 KXLK-CD in Austin, Texas, an ATSC 3.0 station
 KXMD-TV in Williston, North Dakota
 KZDN-LD in Denver, Colorado, on virtual channel 16
 W14CO-D in Clarks Summit, etc., Pennsylvania
 W14CX-D in Knoxville, Tennessee
 W14DA-D in Harpswell, Maine
 W14DK-D in Dagsboro, Delaware
 W14DY-D in Onancock, Virginia
 W14EE-D in Algood, Tennessee, on virtual channel 14
 W14EM-D in Marquette, Michigan
 W14EQ-D in Tupelo, Mississippi
 W14EU-D in Tallahassee, Florida
 WAGV in Harlan, Kentucky, uses WLFG's spectrum
 WCMH-TV in Columbus, Ohio, on virtual channel 4
 WCMN-LD in St. Cloud-Sartell, Minnesota
 WDBB in Bessemer, Alabama
 WDBD in Jackson, Mississippi
 WDSI-TV in Chattanooga, Tennessee
 WDYC-LD in Cincinnati, Ohio, on virtual channel 36
 WECX-LD in Eau Claire, Wisconsin
 WFGX in Fort Walton Beach, Florida
 WFOX-TV in Jacksonville, Florida
 WGBA-TV in Green Bay, Wisconsin
 WHKY-TV in Hickory, North Carolina, on virtual channel 14
 WJKP-LD in Corning, New York
 WLAJ in Lansing, Michigan
 WLZH-LD in Red Lion, Pennsylvania
 WLFG in Grundy, Virginia
 WLNS-TV in Lansing, Michigan, uses WLAJ's spectrum
 WNLO-CD in Norfolk, Virginia, an ATSC 3.0 station
 WNNE in Montpelier, Vermont, uses WPTZ's spectrum
 WOPX-TV in Melbourne, Florida, on virtual channel 56
 WPDS-LD in Largo, etc., Florida, on virtual channel 14
 WPTZ in Plattsburgh, New York
 WRDC in Durham, North Carolina, an ATSC 3.0 station, on virtual channel 28
 WSCG-LD in Beaufort, etc., South Carolina
 WSJP-LD in Aquadilla, Puerto Rico, on virtual channel 18
 WSKC-CD in Atlanta, Georgia, on virtual channel 22
 WTBZ-LD in Gainesville, Florida
 WTIN-TV in Ponce, Puerto Rico, on virtual channel 4
 WTME-LD in Bruce, Mississippi
 WVQS-LD in Isabel Segunda, Puerto Rico, on virtual channel 20, which rebroadcasts WSJN-CD
 WWTD-LD in Washington, D.C., on virtual channel 49
 WXIV-LD in Myrtle Beach, South Carolina
 WXSL-LD in St. Elmo, Illinois

The following stations, which are no longer licensed, formerly broadcast on digital channel 14:
 K14OL-D in Granite Falls, Minnesota
 KBBA-LD in Cedar Falls, Iowa
 KOIB-LD in Columbia, Missouri
 KRHP-LD in The Dalles, Oregon
 KZDE-LD in Fort Collins, Colorado
 W14DJ-D in Myrtle Beach, South Carolina
 WAGC-LD in Atlanta, Georgia
 WAZH-CD in Harrisonburg, Virginia
 WBDI-LD in Springfield, Illinois
 WDLF-LD in Peoria, Illinois
 WIED-LD in Greenville, North Carolina
 WMEI in Arecibo, Puerto Rico
 WNWE-LD in Lincoln, Nebraska
 WPDZ-LD in Buxton, North Carolina
 WWEA-LD in Wausau, Wisconsin

References

14 digital